This is a glossary of some of the terms used in phytopathology.

Phytopathology is the study of plant diseases.  It is a multi-disciplinary science since prerequisites for disease development are the presence of a susceptible host species, a pathogen and the appropriate environmental conditions.  This is known as the disease triangle.  Because of this interaction, the terminology used in phytopathology often comes from other disciplines including those dealing with the host species ( botany / plant science, plant physiology), the pathogen (bacteriology, mycology, nematology, virology), the environment and disease management practices (agronomy, soil science, meteorology, environmental science, ecology, plant breeding, pesticides, entomology), and areas of study that apply to both the host and pathogen (molecular biology, genetics, molecular genetics).  The result is that most phytopathological glossary include terms from these other disciplines in addition to terms (disease incidence, horizontal resistance, gene-for-gene relationship, blast, scab and so on) that are specific to, or which have a unique meaning in phytopathology. This glossary is no exception. However, for the sake of brevity, it has, for the most part, restricted terms from other disciplines to those that pertain to the pathogen.  At some point, these terms should be moved to other glossaries (e.g. glossary of mycology, glossary of nematology, and so on).



A 
abiotic
Disease not caused by living organisms

acceptable daily intake

acervulus (pl. acervuli)
The acervulus is an erumpent, cushionlike fruiting body bearing conidiophores, conidia, and sometimes setae. It is distinguished from a stroma in not having a peridium or covering of fungal tissue of any kind.

acid precipitation

acid rain

acropetal

Actinomycetes
The Actinobacteria or Actinomycetes are a group of Gram-positive bacteria.

acute

acute toxicity

aeciospore

aecium

aflatoxin

agar

aggressiveness

air pollution

alkaloids

allele

allelopathy

alternate host

alternative hosts

alternation of generations

amphid

amphigynous

amphimixis

amphimobile

anaerobic

anamorph (adj. anamorphic; syn. imperfect state)

anastomosis (pl. anastomoses)

anthracnoes

antibiotic

antibody

antigen

antiseptic

apothecium
The apothecium is an open, cuplike, or saucer-shaped sexual fungal fruiting body (ascocarp) containing asci.

antiseptic

appressorium (pl. appressoria)

arbuscular mycorrhiza (abbr. AM; syn. endomycorrhiza)  

arbuscule

ascocarp (syn. ascoma)

ascogenous

ascogonium (pl. ascogonia)

ascoma (pl. ascomata; syn. ascocarp)

Ascomycetes

asci

ascospore

ascostroma (pl. ascostromata)  

ascus (pl. asci) 

aseptate

asexual

asexual reproduction

atrophy

AUDPC (abbr. for Area Under Disease Progress Curve)

autotroph

avirulence (avr) gene

avirulent (syn. nonpathogenic)

axenic

autoecious

B 
bacilliform

bacterial streaming

bactericide

bacteriocin

bacteriophage

bacterium (pl. bacteria)

bactericide

basal knob (syn. stylet knob)

basidiocarp (syn. basidioma)

Basidiomyctes
The Division Basidiomycota is a large taxon within the Kingdom Fungi that includes those species that produce spores in a club-shaped structure called a basidium.

basidiospore

basidium (pl. basidia)

basidiospore

basidium (pl. basidia; adj. basidial)

binary fission

binucleate

bioassay

biocide

biocontrol (syn. biological control)

biotic
A disease caused by a living organism

biotroph (syn. obligate parasite)

biotype

bitunicate

blasting

blight

blotch

breaking

broadcast application

brooming

brown rot (of wood)

burn

bursa

C 
canker

capsid (syn. coat protein)

carcinogen

carrier

casting

causal agent

certification

cfu (abbr. for colony forming unit)

chemotaxis (syn. chemotropism)  

chemotherapy

chlamydospore

chlamydospore
A chlamydospore is the thick-walled big resting spore of several kinds of fungi.

chlorosis

chronic toxicity

chytridiomycetes

circulative-propagative transmission (syn. propagative transmission)  

circulative transmission (syn. persistent transmission) 

cirrus

cleistothecium

clamp connection

clavate (or claviform)

coalesce

coat protein (syn. capsid) 

coccus (pl. cocci)

coelomycetes

colonization

colony

colony forming unit (abbr. cfu)

compartmentalization

conidiogenesis

conidiogenous

conidioma (pl. conidiomata)

conidiophore

conidium (pl. conidia) 

conjugation

conk

constitutive

contact fungicide (syn. protectant fungicide)

coremium (pl. coremia; syn. synnema)

cross-protection

crozier

cryptobiosis (hidden life)

curl

cyst

cytopathology

D 

damping-off

days to harvest

decay

degree-day

demicyclic

deuteromycetes (syn. Fungi Imperfecti)

diagnostic

antigen

diploid
Diploid (2x) cells have two copies (homologs) of each chromosome, usually one from the mother and one from the father.

diapause

dieback (v. die back)

differential host (syn. differential cultivar)

differential medium

differentiation

dikaryon (adj. dikaryotic)

dilution plating

dilution streaking

dimorphic

direct penetration

Discomycetes

disease

disease cycle

disease incidence

disease progress curve

disease pyramid

disease severity

disease triangle

disinfect

disinfest

dispersal (syn. dissemination) 

dissemination (syn. dispersal)

dolipore septum

dormancy (adj. dormant)

downy mildew

drift (of pesticides)

drought 

durable resistance

dwarfing

E 
echinulate

economic threshold

ectomycorrhiza (pl. ectomycorrhizae) 

ectoparasite 

ectotrophic

elicitor

enation

encapsidate

encyst

endemic

endogenous

endophytic

endoconidium (pl. endoconidia)

endomycorrhiza (pl. endomycorrhizae; syn. arbuscular mycorrhiza) 

endoparasite

endospore

epidemic

epidemiology

epinasty

epiphytotic
 The epidemic condition of a disease, in a plant population. Compare with enphytotic

eradicant

eradication

ergot

ergotism

erumpent

escape

etiolation

etiology

exclusion

exogenous

exudate

F 
f. sp. (abbr. for forma specialis)

facultative parasite

facultative saprotroph

fasciation

fastidious

filamentous (syn. filiform)  

flagellum

flagging

fleck

focus (pl. foci) 

forest decline

forma specialis (abbr. f.sp.; pl. formae speciales) 

fructification

fruiting body

fumigant (v. fumigate)

Fungi Imperfecti (syn. Deuteromycetes

fungicide (adj. fungicidal)
Chemical designed to kill fungi

fungus (pl. fungi)

fungistat (adj. fungistatic)
Inhibits growth of some fungi.

fungistasis

fusiform

G 

gall

gametangium (pl. gametangia)

gametophyte

gene-for-gene hypothesis

general resistance (syn. horizontal resistance, race non-specific resistance)

genotype

germ theory

giant cell

girdle

giant cells

gram-negative
Gram-negative bacteria are those that do not retain crystal violet dye in the Gram staining protocol.

gram-positive
Gram-positive bacteria are classified as bacteria that retain a crystal violet dye during the Gram stain process.

gram stain

growth regulator (syn. hormone) 

gummosis (pl. gummoses)

H 

haploid

hardiness

haustorium (pl. haustoria)
 The haustorium is the hyphal tip of a parasitic fungus

hemiparasite

hermaphrodite (adj. hermaphroditic) 

heteroecious

heterokaryon (adj. heterokaryotic) 

heterothallic

heterotroph

holomorph

holoparasite

homokaryon (adj. homokaryotic) 

homothallism (adj. homothallic)

horizontal resistance (syn. general resistance, race non-specific resistance)

host plant

host range

hyaline

hymenium

hyperparasite

hyperplasia

hypertrophy

hypersensitive

hypersensitive reaction and pathogenicity (hrp) gene

hypersensitive response (HR) 

hypha

hyphal sheath (syn. mantle)

hyphomycetes

hyphopodium

hypoplasia

hypovirulence
 hypovirulence is reduced virulence of a pathogen. Hypovirulence in fungi can be caused by a virus within the fungus. The virus reduces virulence and sporulation. A hypovirus-fungus can be used in biological control.

I 

immune

immunity

imperfect fungi (syn. Fungi Imperfecti, deuteromycetes)

imperfect state (syn. anamorph)
in planta

in situ

in vitro

in vivo

incubation period

indicator plant

indirect penetration

induced

induced systemic resistance (ISR)

infection court

infection cushion

infection focus

infection peg (syn. penetration peg) 

infection period

infectious

infective

infest (n. infestation)  

initial inoculum (syn. primary inoculum)

injury

inoculate (n. inoculation)

inoculum (pl. inocula)

inoculum density

integrated pest management (abbr. IPM)

intumescence (syn. edema or oedema) 

IPM (abbr. for integrated pest management) 

isolate

K 

klendusity
The disease-escaping ability of plants.

Koch's postulates

knot

L 

latent infection

latent period

leaf dip

leaf spot

leafroll

lesion

life cycle

lignification

local lesion

local necrosis

lodge

M 

macerate

macroconidium (pl. macroconidia) 

macrocyclic

macronutrient

mantle (syn. hyphal sheath)  

mating types

mechanical injury

mechanical transmission

medium (pl. media) 

melanin

microbial

microclimate

microconidium (pl. microconidia) 

microcyclic

microflora

micronutrient

microorganism (syn. microbe)

microsclerotium  

mildew

MLO (syn. mycoplasmalike organism) 

mold

mollicute

monocyclic

monoecious

monogenic

monogenic resistance (syn. single gene resistance)

monotrichous

monoxenic culture

mosaic

motile

mottle

movement protein

multigenic resistance (syn. polygenic resistance)

multiline

multinucleate

multiparticulate virus

multipartite virus

multiseptate

mummification

mummy

mushroom

mutagen

Mycelia sterilia

mycelium (pl. mycelia)
Mycelium is the vegetative part of a fungus consisting of a mass of branching, threadlike hyphae that exists below the ground or within another substrate.

mycology

mycoparasite

mycoplasmalike organism (syn. MLO) 

mycorrhiza (pl. mycorrhizae; adj. mycorrhizal)  

mycotoxin

mycovirus

Myxomycetes (syn. slime molds)

N 

necrosis (adj. necrotic) 

necrotroph

needle cast (of conifers) 

nematicide
A nematicide is a type of chemical pesticide used to kill parasitic nematodes.

nematode
Nematodes are unsegmented, bilaterally symmetric and triploblastic protostomes with a complete digestive system.

nitrogen oxides

noninfectious disease

nonpathogenic (syn. avirulent) 

nonpersistent transmission (syn. stylet-borne transmission)

nonseptate

O 

obligate parasite (syn. biotroph)

occlusion

oedema (also edema; syn. intumescence)  

oligogenic resistance

oogonium (pl. oogonia)
An oogonium is a female gametogonium.

oomycetes (adj. oomycetous)

oospore

ooze

ostiole (adj. ostiolate)

overwinter

P 

pandemic

papilla

paragynous

parasexualism

parasite (adj. parasitic)

parasitism

parthenogenesis (adj. parthenogenetic)

partial resistance

pasteurization

pathogen (adj. pathogenic) 

pathogenesis-related (PR) proteins

pathogenicity

pathology

pathotype

pathovar (abbr. pv.) 

penetration

penetration peg (syn. infection peg) 

perfect (see teleomorph)

perithecium (pl. perithecia)

peritrichate

persistent transmission (syn. circulative transmission) 

pest

pesticide

phenological synchrony

phenotype

phloem necrosis

Phycomycete

phyllody

phylloplane-competent

physiogenic disease

phytoalexin

phytopathogenic

phytopathology (syn. plant pathology) 

phytoplasma (syn. mycoplasmalike organism, MLO) 

phytosanitary certificate

phytotoxic

plant pathology (syn. phytopathology) 

plasmodiophoromycetes

plasmodium (pl. plasmodia) 

polycyclic

polyetic

polygenic resistance (syn. multigenic resistance)

polymorphism

polyprotein

powdery mildew

predispose (n. predisposition)

primary inoculum (syn. initial inoculum) 

proinhibitin

prokaryote

promycelium (pl. promycelia)  

propagative transmission (syn. circulative propagative transmission)  

propagule

protectant

protectant fungicide (syn. contact fungicide)

pseudothecium (pl. pseudothecia)

Puccinia pathway

pustule

pv. (abbr. for pathovar)

pycnidiospore

pycnium (pl. pycnia; syn. spermagonium)

Q 

qualitative resistance

quantitative resistance

quarantine

quiescent

quiescent

dormant or inactive

quorum sensing

R 

race

race non-specific resistance (syn. general resistance, horizontal resistance)

receptive hypha

reniform

resinosis

resistant (n. resistance)  

rhizomorph

rhizosphere

rhizosphere-competent

ringspot

rosette

rot

roundworm

rugose

russet

rust

S 

sanitation

sap transmission

saprobe (syn. saprotroph)

saprotroph
A saprotroph (or saprobe) is an organism that obtains its nutrients from non-living organic matter, usually dead and decaying plant or animal matter, by absorbing soluble organic compounds.
scab

scald

sclerenchyma (adj. sclerenchymatous)

sclerotium (pl. sclerotia) 
A sclerotium is a compact mass of hardened mycelium (as an ergot) stored with reserve food material that in some higher fungi becomes detached and remains dormant until a favorable opportunity for growth occurs.

scorch

secondary infection

secondary inoculum

secondary metabolite

secondary organism

seed treatment

seedborne

selective medium 

septate

serrate

sessile

seta (pl. setae)

sexual spore

sexually compatible

shot-hole

sign

single gene resistance (syn. monogenic resistance)

slime molds (syn. Myxomycetes)

smut

soft rot

soil drench

soilborne

soil pasteurization

soil sterilization

solarization

sooty mold

sorus (pl. sori)

sp. (abbr. for species; pl. spp.)

species

specific resistance (syn. vertical resistance)

spermagonium (pl. spermagonia; syn. pycnium for rust fungi) 

spermatium (pl. spermatia; syn. pycniospore for rust fungi)

spicule

spiroplasma - helical, motile, cell wall-less bacterium; member of genus Spiroplasma in class Mollicutes

sporangiophore

sporangiospore

sporangium (pl. sporangia)

spore

sporidium (pl.sporidia)

sporocarp

spore-bearing fruiting body

sporodochium (pl.sporodochia)

sporogenous

sporophore

sporophyte

sporulate

spot

stabilizing selection

staghead

stem pitting

sterigma (pl. sterigmata)

sterilant

sterile fungus

sterilization (adj. sterilized)

stippling

strain

streak

striate (n. striations)

stroma (pl. stromata)

stunting

stylet knob (syn. basal knob)

stylet-borne transmission (syn. nonpersistent transmission)

subspecies

substrate

sunscald or sunburn

suppressive soil

susceptible (n. susceptibility)

symptom

symptomless carrier

syncytium (pl. syncytia)

synergism (adj. synergistic)

synnema (pl. synnemata; syn. coremium)

systematics

systemic

systemic acquired resistance (SAR) 

systemic fungicide

T 

teleomorph (syn. perfect state)

teliospore (sometimes called teleutospore, teleutosporodesm)  
Teliospore (sometimes called teleutospore) is the thick-walled resting spore of some fungi (rusts and smuts), from which the basidium arises.

telium (pl. telia)

temporary wilt

thallus

thermotherapy

tolerance (adj. tolerant) 

toxicity

toxin

transmit (n. transmission)

trap crop

transmit (n. transmission)

trenching 

tumor (syn. gall)

type

U 

urediniospore (also urediospore, uredospore) 

uredinium (also uredium; pl. uredinia)

V 

vascular wilt disease

vector

vein banding

vein clearing

vermiform

vertical resistance (syn. specific resistance)

viable (n. viability)

virescence

virion

viroid

viroplasm

virulence

virulent

viruliferous

virus-laden, usually applied to insects or nematodes as vectors

virus
A virus is a microscopic particle (ranging in size from 20 - 300 nm) that can infect the cells of a biological organism.

viscin

W 

walling-off

water-soaked

white rot (of wood)

white rust

wild type

wilt

winterburn

witches' broom

wound

X 

XLB (xylem-limited fastidious bacteria)

xylem-limited fastidious bacteria (XLB)

Y 

yellowing

yellows

Z 

zonate

zoosporangium

zoospore
A zoospore is a motile asexual spore utilizing a flagellum for locomotion.

Zygomycetes

zygospore
A zygospore is a sexual part of a fungus, a chlamydospore that is created by the nuclear fusion of haploid hyphae of different mating types.

References 
 Illustrated Glossary of Plant Pathology, American Phytopathological Society
 Plant Disease Control Glossary, Oregon State University
 Mycological Glossary, Illinois Mycological Association
 On-Line Glossary of Technical Terms in Plant Pathology, Cornell University (with pronunciation guide)

Phytopathology
Phytopathology
Phytopathology
Wikipedia glossaries using description lists